Bostanlı İskele is a light-rail station on the Karşıyaka Tram line of the Tram İzmir system. The station is located on Hasan Ali Yücel Boulevard, adjacent to the Bostanlı ferry terminal. The station consists of two side platforms, one on each side of the boulevard. 

Bostanlı İskele station is the only station on the Karıyaka line to be split across a street. The westbound (Ataşehir) track is located on the north side of Hasan Ali Yücel Boulevard, in front of the Suat Taser Open-air Theater, while the eastbound (Alaybey) track is located on the south side, in front of the Bostanlı ferry terminal. Both platforms are wheelchair-accessible and are integrated with the city-wide smartcard, İzmirimkart.

Bostanlı İskele station was opened on 11 April 2017.

References

Railway stations opened in 2017
2017 establishments in Turkey
Karşıyaka District
Tram transport in İzmir